Dolomedes venmani is a species of araneomorph spider in the family Pisauridae.

Distribution 
The species is endemic to Australia. It is found in the south-east of Queensland and the north-east of New South Wales.

Description 
The male holotype measures  and the female paratype .

Etymology 
The species is named in honour of Jack Venman (a farmer who sold his 255 acre farm to the Queensland Government in 1971 for A$1 in an effort to protect the biodiversity in the area).

References 

Pisauridae
Endemic fauna of Australia
Spiders of Australia
Spiders described in 2018